Stephen Baker (August 12, 1819 – June 9, 1875) was an American politician and a U.S. Representative from New York during the American Civil War.

Early life
Baker was born in New York City, New York on August 12, 1819. He was a son of Stephen Baker, a merchant who was one of the original stockholders in the Manhattan Company, founded in 1799. He attended the common schools.

Career
In 1850, Baker engaged as importer of woolen goods, and moved to Poughkeepsie, New York.

He was elected as a Republican to the Thirty-seventh Congress, serving as U.S. Representative for the twelfth district of New York from March 4, 1861 to March 4, 1863.  After his term in office, he abandoned active business pursuits and lived in retirement until his death.

Personal life
Baker was married to Anna Mary Greene (1827–1903). Together, they were the parents of:

 Stephen Baker (1859–1946), who served as president and chairman of the board of the Bank of the Manhattan Company, the earliest predecessor of Chase Bank, and an associate of John D. Rockefeller, Jr. Baker married Mary Dabney Payson (1865–1948), a daughter of Francis Payson and sister of William Farquhar Payson, in 1890.

While en route to California for his health, on a train near Ogden, Utah, Baker died on June 9, 1875, aged 55 years and 301 days.  He was interred at the Poughkeepsie Rural Cemetery in Poughkeepsie.

References

External links

1819 births
1875 deaths
People of New York (state) in the American Civil War
Republican Party members of the United States House of Representatives from New York (state)
19th-century American politicians